Gypsy is an unincorporated community in Creek County, in the U.S. state of Oklahoma.  It is about twelve miles south-southwest of Bristow.

History
A post office called Gypsy was established in 1925, and remained in operation until it was discontinued in 1955. Gypsy's local community took its name from the Gypsy Oil Company.

References

Unincorporated communities in Creek County, Oklahoma
Unincorporated communities in Oklahoma